Big Rosy Bone Knob is a mountain located in the Catskill Mountains of New York southwest of West Shokan. Little Rocky is located north-northeast, and Steiny Hill is located south of Big Rosy Bone Knob.

References

Mountains of Ulster County, New York
Mountains of New York (state)